Kimeli Naiyomah is a Kenyan national and Maasai warrior.

Early life 
He attended the University of Oregon. He holds undergraduate and graduate degrees in Biological Sciences from Stanford University and Duke University. 
Kimeli started his primary Education in small village school Empurkel Primary School,
Later Attended his secondary Education at Kilgoris boys secondary school.

Career 
Naiyomah is responsible for 14 Cows for America, the sole official gift to the United States from the Republic of Kenya in memory of the terrorist attacks of September 11, 2001. The story inspired a children's book named 14 Cows for America written by Carmen Agra Deedy with Wilson Kimeli Naiyomah, the book was illustrated by Thomas Gonzalez and published by Peachtree Publishers.

References

External links

University of Oregon alumni
Living people
Stanford University alumni
Year of birth missing (living people)
Maasai people